Emilio Salgari (but often erroneously ; 21 August 1862 – 25 April 1911) was an Italian writer of action adventure swashbucklers and a pioneer of science fiction.

In Italy, his extensive body of work was more widely read than that of Dante Alighieri. Today he is still among the 40 most translated Italian authors. Many of his most popular novels have been adapted as comics, animated series and feature films. He is considered the father of Italian adventure fiction and Italian pop culture, and the "grandfather" of the Spaghetti Western.

Life

Emilio Salgari was born in Verona to a family of modest merchants. From a young age, he had a desire to explore the seas and studied seamanship at a nautical technical institution in Venice, but his academic performance was too poor, and he never graduated.

He began his writing career as a reporter on the daily La Nuova Arena, which published some of his work as serials.  As his powers of narration grew, so did his reputation for having lived a life of adventure. He claimed to have explored the Sudan desert, met Buffalo Bill in Nebraska (he had actually met him during his "Wild West Show" tour of Italy), and sailed the Seven Seas. His early biographies were filled with adventurous tales set in the Far East, events which he claimed were the basis for much of his work. Salgari had actually never ventured farther than the Adriatic Sea.

He turned his passion for exploration and discovery to writing. His first stories were serialized in newspapers.  Early in his career, he began signing his tales as "Captain Salgari", a title he once defended in a duel when his claim to it was questioned.

Though knighted by the Queen of Italy and wildly popular, Salgari did not earn much money from his books and lived hand to mouth for most of his life.

Salgari married Ida Peruzzi – nicknamed "Aida," with whom he was very happy for years. The couple had four children.  Salgari's private life was clouded by several tragedies. In 1889 his father committed suicide. Ida became ill after 1903 and Salgari's struggling increased with her medical bills.

These events led Salgari to depression, and he attempted suicide in 1910. After Ida  was committed to a mental ward in 1911, Salgari was overwhelmed and took his own life soon afterwards, imitating the Japanese ritual of seppuku, and died on 25 April 1911. He left three letters, addressed to his and Ida's children, his publisher, and the editors of his newspaper in Turin. The letter to his publisher said:

 One of the sons of Emilio and Aida also committed suicide in 1933.

Writing career
Salgari wrote more than 200 adventure stories and novels, setting his tales in exotic locations, with heroes from a wide variety of cultures.  He gained inspiration from reading foreign literature and newspapers, travel magazines and encyclopedias, which he used to portray his heroes' worlds. He wrote four major series: The Pirates of Malaysia; The Black Corsair Saga; The Pirates of Bermuda; and a collection of adventures set in the Old West. Salgari's heroes were mostly pirates, outlaws and barbarians, fighting against greed, abuse of power, and corruption.

His most legendary heroes Sandokan, The Tiger of Malaysia, a Bornean prince turned pirate, and his loyal lieutenant Yanez of Gomera, led their men in attacks against the Dutch and British fleets. They declared war on James Brooke, the White Rajah of Sarawak, and tried to force him from his throne. The Black Corsair and Captain Morgan maintained a chivalric code in the Caribbean, while Salgari's pirates of Bermuda fought for American independence.

His tales had been so popular that soon his publisher hired other writers to develop adventure stories under his name.  They added 50 novels to his “canon”. Salgari's style was imitated by many, but no other Italian adventure writer managed to duplicate his popular success.

Legacy

Salgari's work was imitated in one form or another by many who came after him. A large part of the Italian adventure literature is a continuation of Salgari's work. Many late 19th century writers such as Luigi Motta and Emilio Fancelli wrote further Sandokan adventures imitating Salgari's style: fast-paced, filled with great battles, blood, violence and punctuated with humour.

The style soon spread to movies and television. One example is the work of the  director Sergio Leone, whose outlaw heroes in his Spaghetti Westerns were inspired by Salgari's piratical adventurers. More than 50 film adaptations have been made of Salgari's novels, and many more were inspired by his work (corsair stories, jungle adventure stories, and swashbuckling B movies, such as Morgan, the Pirate, starring Steve Reeves).

Federico Fellini loved Salgari's books. Pietro Mascagni had over 50 Salgari titles in his library. Umberto Eco read Salgari's works as a child.

His work was very popular in Portugal, Spain and Spanish-speaking countries, where Latin American writers such as Gabriel Garcia Marquez, Isabel Allende, Carlos Fuentes, Jorge Luis Borges and Pablo Neruda, all attested to reading him when young. Che Guevara read 62 of his books, according to his biographer Paco Ignacio Taibo II, who remarked that the revolutionary's anti-imperialism could be seen to be "Salgarian in origin".

Though popular with the masses, Salgari was shunned by critics throughout his life and for most of the 20th century. It was not until the late 1990s that his writings began to be revisited, and new translations appeared in print. They have been newly appreciated for their characterization and plots.  In 2001 the first National Salgari Association was founded in Italy to celebrate his work.

Films

Historians debate the first film adaptation of a Salgari novel. Cabiria, directed by Giovanni Pastrone bears many similarities to Emilio Salgari's 1908 adventure novel Cartagine in Fiamme (Carthage is Burning). Salgari was never credited, and Gabriele D'Annunzio was billed as the official screenwriter. D'Annunzio had been brought on board to help revise the film once it had been shot, earning the credit by changing the title to Cabiria, changing the name of some of the characters, and rewriting the captions from what Pastrone had done. The three-hour epic movie with its cast of thousands created a sensation throughout Italy. It pioneered epic screen production and foreshadowed the work of D.W. Griffith, Sergei Eisenstein and others.

Vitale De Stefano brought Salgari's pirates to the big screen in the early 1920s with a series of five films shot over two years, including Il corsaro nero The Black Corsair and La Regina dei caraibi (The Queen of the Caribbean). Lex Barker appeared as the tiger hunter Tremal-Naik in the 1955 B-movie The Mystery of The Black Jungle. Sandokan was played by Hercules star Steve Reeves in Sandokan the Great and The Pirates of Malaysia aka The Pirates of The Seven Seas. Ray Danton played the pirate in Luigi Capuano's Sandokan Against the Leopard of Sarawak (aka Throne of Vengeance.) and later reprised the role in Sandokan Fights Back (aka The Conqueror and the Empress).

The 1944 Mexican film El corsario negro is based on his novel The Black Corsair.

The 1965 adventure film La montagna di luce (The Mountain of Light) was loosely based on Salgari's 1902 novel of the same title, which referred to the name of the Koh-i-Noor diamond. The film was released in English under several titles, the most commonly known of which was Jungle Adventurer. One of the alternate titles used for a later re-release was Sandok, an attempt to capitalize on the popularity of Salgari's fictional pirate Sandokan, even though neither the novel, nor the film had anything to do with Sandokan's character or the settings of his adventures (the plot revolved around a fictitious attempt to steal the Koh-i-Noor, and took place in 19th-century India).

In 1976, the landmark Sandokan TV miniseries played throughout Europe. It starred Kabir Bedi in the title role and attracted more than 80 million viewers a week. Bedi has been considered the quintessential Sandokan ever since. He later reprised the role in the late 1990s in a series of sequels.

Publishers
Salgari's works have been published by numerous publishing houses worldwide. These include: Donath, Viglongo, Carroccio, RCS MediaGroup, and Mondadori in Italian; Saturnino Calleja, Editorial Porrúa (Colección Sepan Cuantos) and Ediciones Gaviota in Spanish; Editora Illuminuras  in Portuguese; Bouquins in French; ABLIT Verlag in German; and ROH Press in English.
ROH Press has been republishing the novels in Italian, with their translations into English and Spanish.

Work available in English

Though Salgari's novels have been popular in Europe and Latin America for over a century, at present only nine titles are available in English.

The Tigers of Malaysia series
 The Mystery of the Black Jungle
 Sandokan: The Tigers of Mompracem
 Sandokan: The Pirates of Malaysia
 Sandokan: The Two Tigers
 Sandokan: The King of the Sea
 Sandokan: Quest for a Throne

The Black Corsair series
 The Black Corsair
 The Queen of the Caribbean

Captain Tempesta
 Captain Tempesta

Bibliography

The Sandokan series

 The Mystery of the Black Jungle (I Misteri della Jungla Nera, 1895)
 The Tigers of Mompracem (Le tigri di Mompracem, 1900)
 The Pirates of Malaysia (I pirati della Malesia, 1896)
 The Two Tigers (Le due Tigri, 1904)
 The King of the Sea (Il re del mare, 1906)
 Quest for a Throne (Alla conquista di un impero, 1907)
 Sandokan to the Rescue (Sandokan alla riscossa, 1907)
 Return to Mompracem (La riconquista di Mompracem, 1908)
 The Brahman (Il Bramino dell’Assam, 1911)
 An Empire Crumbles (La caduta di un impero, 1911)
 Yanez’ Revenge (La rivincita di Yanez, 1913)

The last three tiles were published posthumously.

The Black Corsair series
 The Black Corsair (Il Corsaro Nero, 1898)
 The Queen of the Caribbean (La regina dei Caraibi, 1901)
 Yolanda, the Black Corsair's Daughter (Jolanda, la figlia del Corsaro Nero, 1905)
 The Son of the Red Corsair (Il figlio del Corsaro Rosso, 1908)
 The Last Pirates (Gli ultimi filibustieri, 1908)

The Pirates of Bermuda series
 I corsari delle Bermude (1909)
 La crociera della Tuonante (1910)
 Straordinarie avventure di Testa di Pietra (1915)

Adventures in the Old West series
 Sulle frontiere del Far-West (1908)
 La scotennatrice (1909)
 Le selve ardenti (1910)

Other series

Two sailors
 Il Tesoro del Presidente del Paraguay (1894)
 Il Continente Misterioso (1894)

Il Fiore delle Perle
 Le stragi delle Filippine (1897)
 Il Fiore delle Perle (1901)

I figli dell'aria
 I Figli dell'Aria (1904)
 Il Re dell'Aria (1907)

Captain Tempesta
 Captain Tempesta (Capitan Tempesta, 1905)
 The Lion of Damascus (Il Leone di Damasco, 1910)

Short stories
 I racconti della Bibliotechina aurea illustrata (1900–1906)
 Le novelle marinaresche di Mastro Catrame (1894)
 Le grandi pesche nei mari australi (1904)

Adventure anthology
Excerpts from 15 of Salgari's titles were collected in Storie Rosse in 1910. Each excerpt is introduced by a brief synopsis of the novel it was drawn from.

Other adventures

Adventures set in India and Asia 
 I naufragatori dell'Oregon (1896)
 La rosa del Dong-Giang (1897; also known as: Tay-See)
 Il capitano della Djumna (1897)
 Sul mare delle perle (1903)
 La città del re lebbroso (1904)
 La gemma del fiume rosso (1904)
 La Perla Sanguinosa (1905)

Adventures set in Africa 
 I drammi della schiavitù (1896)
 La Costa d'Avorio (1898)
 Le caverne dei diamanti (1899)
 Le avventure di un marinaio in Africa (1899)
 La giraffa bianca (1902)
 La montagna d'oro (1901; also known as: Il treno volante)

Adventures set in the desert and the Middle East 
 Il re della montagna (1895)
 I predoni del Sahara (1903)
 I briganti del Riff (1911)
 I predoni del gran deserto (1911)

Tales of lost cities and great treasures 
 La scimitarra di Budda (1892)
 La città dell'oro (1898)
 Duemila leghe sotto l'America (1888) (also known as Il tesoro misterioso)
 La montagna di luce (1902)
 Il tesoro della montagna azzurra (1907)

Adventures set in Russia 
 Gli orrori della Siberia (1900)
 L'eroina di Port Arthur (1904, also known as La Naufragatrice)
 Le aquile della steppa (1907)

Adventures set in the Old West 
 Il re della Prateria (1896)
 Il figlio del cacciatore d'orsi (1899)
 Avventure fra le pellirosse (1900)
 La sovrana del campo d'oro (1905)

Adventures set in the lands of ice and snow 
 Nel paese dei ghiacci (1896)
 Al Polo Australe in velocipede (1895)
 Al Polo Nord (1898)
 La Stella Polare e il suo viaggio avventuroso (1901; also known as: Verso l'Artide con la Stella Polare)
 La Stella dell'Araucania (1906)
 Una sfida al Polo (1909)

Historical Adventures 
 Le pantere di Algeri (1903)
 Le figlie dei Faraoni (1905)
 Cartagine in fiamme (1908)

Survival stories 
 I pescatori di balene (1894)
 I Robinson italiani (1896)
 Attraverso l'Atlantico in pallone (1896)
 I minatori dell'Alaska (1900)
 L'uomo di fuoco (1904)

Adventures on the High Seas 
 Un dramma nell'Oceano Pacifico (1895)
 I naufraghi del Poplador (1895)
 I pescatori di Trepang (1896)
 Gli scorridori del mare (1900)
 I solitari dell'Oceano (1904)
 Sull'Atlante (1907)

Adventures set during times of war and revolution 
 La favorita del Mahdi (1887)
 La capitana del Yucatan (1899)
 Le stragi della China (1901; also known as: Il sotterraneo della morte)

Adventures set in Italy 
 I naviganti della Meloria (1902)

Adventures involving time travel 
 Le meraviglie del Duemila (1907)

Autobiographical 
 La Bohème italiana (1909)

References

 O. Nalesini, L'Asia Sud-orientale nella cultura italiana. Bibliografia analitica ragionata, 1475–2005. Roma, IsIAO, 2009, pp. 350–362 
 "Emilio Salgari", ROH Press, in English. Also includes images from movies and animated series based on his novels.
 "Emilio Salgari: Literature’s Invisible Man", ROH Press, in English.
 Read a review of the Sandokan series.
 Carla Passino, "Book of the Week: Sandokan, the Tigers of Mompracem", Italy Magazine, December 2009

External links
  
  
 "Italy’s enduring love affair with Emilio Salgari", The Economist, June 2017
 
 
 
 The Tiger of Malaysia, Barga News
 
 
 Angela Valenti Durazzo "Il Corsaro Nero Signore di Ventimiglia"

1862 births
1911 suicides
Writers from Verona
Italian historical novelists
Nautical historical novelists
Writers of historical fiction set in the early modern period
Suicides by sharp instrument in Italy
Italian fantasy writers
Italian science fiction writers
Maritime writers
Italian children's writers
Italian journalists
Italian male journalists
Italian male short story writers
Italian male novelists
1911 deaths